Donald Kirk David (February 15, 1896 - April 13, 1979) was the third dean of the Harvard Business School, serving from 1942 to 1955.

Donald K. David, the Chairman of the Committee for Economic Development (CED), established a national Commission on Money and Credit (CMC), November 21, 1957.  The report of the Commission was published in June 1961 and it was subsequently disbanded.

He graduated from University of Idaho and Harvard Business School.

References

Archives and records
Donald K. David papers at Baker Library Special Collections, Harvard Business School

1896 births
Harvard Business School faculty
Business school deans
University of Idaho alumni
Harvard Business School alumni
1979 deaths
American university and college faculty deans
20th-century American academics